The 1950 Philadelphia Athletics season involved the A's finishing eighth in the American League with a record of 52 wins and 102 losses. It would be 87-year-old Connie Mack's 50th and last as A's manager, a North American professional sports record. During that year the team wore uniforms trimmed in blue and gold, in honor of the Golden Jubilee of "The Grand Old Man of Baseball."

Offseason 
 December 13, 1949: Ray Coleman, Billy DeMars, Frankie Gustine, Ray Ippolito (minors) and $100,000 were traded by the Athletics to the St. Louis Browns for Bob Dillinger and Paul Lehner.

Regular season

Season standings

Record vs. opponents

Roster

Player stats

Batting

Starters by position 
Note: Pos = Position; G = Games played; AB = At bats; H = Hits; Avg. = Batting average; HR = Home runs; RBI = Runs batted in

Other batters 
Note: G = Games played; AB = At bats; H = Hits; Avg. = Batting average; HR = Home runs; RBI = Runs batted in

Pitching

Starting pitchers 
Note: G = Games pitched; IP = Innings pitched; W = Wins; L = Losses; ERA = Earned run average; SO = Strikeouts

Other pitchers 
Note: G = Games pitched; IP = Innings pitched; W = Wins; L = Losses; ERA = Earned run average; SO = Strikeouts

Relief pitchers 
Note: G = Games pitched; W = Wins; L = Losses; SV = Saves; ERA = Earned run average; SO = Strikeouts

Farm system

References

External links
1950 Philadelphia Athletics team at Baseball-Reference
1950 Philadelphia Athletics team page at baseball-almanac.com

Oakland Athletics seasons
Philadelphia Athletics season
Oak